The 2014–15 Bulgarian Hockey League season was the 63rd season of the Bulgarian Hockey League, the top level of ice hockey in Bulgaria. Four teams participated in the league, and HC CSKA Sofia won the championship.

Regular season

External links
 Season on eurohockey.com

Bulgarian Hockey League seasons
Bul